The Marys Rock Tunnel is a vehicular tunnel in the Blue Ridge Mountains. Located at mile marker 32.2 on Skyline Drive, the scenic byway that traverses the length of Shenandoah National Park, it is the only vehicular tunnel in the park. Constructed in 1932 by workers employed with the Civilian Conservation Corps, the tunnel workers took three months to drill and blast through the east slopes of Mary's Rock.

See also
List of tunnels documented by the Historic American Engineering Record in Virginia

References

External links

Buildings and structures in Bland County, Virginia
Historic American Engineering Record in Virginia
Road tunnels in Virginia
Tunnels completed in 1932